Raghu Ram Pillarisetti  is an Indian surgeon, and the Founder and Director of KIMS-Ushalakshmi Center for Breast Diseases at KIMS Hospitals.  Pillarisetti is the founder of Ushalakshmi Breast Cancer Foundation, a not-for-profit organisation, and Pink Connexion, a quarterly newsletter about breast healthcare.

He is best known as the youngest recipient of the Overseas Gold Medal of the Royal College of Surgeons of Edinburgh and  In 2021, he became the first surgeon of Indian origin to be conferred the Honorary Fellowship of the Association of Surgeons of Great Britain and Ireland. He is one of the youngest Surgeons of Indian origin in over 100 years to be honoured with an OBE – Officer of the Most Excellent Order of the British Empire

Early life and education

Pillarisetti was born on 22 September 1966, in Guntur, in the undivided state of Andhra Pradesh, in India, to medical doctor parents, Prof. P. V. Chalapathi Rao, a recipient of Dr. B.C. Roy National Award, and Ushalakshmi Kumari, a breast cancer survivor. He did his schooling from the Hyderabad Public School, where one of his classmates was Satya Nadella, the Chairman and CEO of Microsoft. He graduated in medicine (MBBS) from Siddhartha Medical College,  and secured a master's degree in surgery (MS), obtaining the first place, from Kasturba Medical College, in 1995. He then went to UK and obtained FRCS in 1997 from all the four Surgical Royal Colleges in the British Isles (England, Edinburgh, Glasgow, Ireland). He subsequently completed Higher Surgical Training & subspecialty training in oncoplastic breast surgery at the Royal Marsden NHS Foundation Trust in London and at the Nottingham Breast Institute. He also holds a fellowship of the American College of Surgeons.

Career 
In 2002, Pillarisetti's mother was diagnosed with breast cancer. He relocated to India in 2007 and established a dedicated purpose-built facility for breast health care at KIMS Hospitals in Hyderabad. The centre, KIMS-Ushalakshmi Center for Breast Diseases, bears his mother's name (Ushalakshmi).

Pillarisetti founded Ushalakshmi Breast Cancer Foundation, with Amitabh Bachchan and P. V. Sindhu as its ambassadors,  for spreading awareness about the disease and, later, started publishing Pink Connexion, a quarterly newsletter. Since 2007, the annual "Pink Ribbon Campaign" was launched to raise awareness on breast cancer during the month of October (international breast cancer awareness month).

Between 2012 – 2016, he has overseen the implementation of south Asia's largest population-based breast cancer screening programme in the southern Indian states of Telangana and Andhra Pradesh. Women diagnosed with breast cancer were treated free of cost under the State Government's Arogyasree scheme.

In 2016, the Government of India invited him to be part of the Steering Committee and a high powered Technical Advisory Group (TAG) set up by the Union Ministry of Health, which has drafted guidelines to replicate the Clinical Breast Examination (CBE) based breast cancer screening programme across the nation.

He was appointed as an International Surgical Adviser of the Royal College of Surgeons of Edinburgh in 2012.

He is one of the youngest surgeons elected to serve as President, The Association of Surgeons of India (ASI) for the year 2020. ASI is South Asia's largest and the world's second largest surgical organization that represents the surgical fraternity in India. As President ASI, he launched five Skills Courses & the National Online Skills Enhancement Programme (NSEP) in 2020, which are aimed to enhance the knowledge base & improve the skill sets of surgical trainees.

As Convenor of International Affairs for the Association of Surgeons of India (2017 – 2018), he initiated a working partnership between the Association of Surgeons of India and the Royal College of Surgeons of England, thereby facilitating the process of selecting surgical trainees from India to obtain advanced subspecialty surgical training at selected centres of excellence in the UK through the Royal College's International Surgical Training Programme (ISTP).

He was a member of the governing council of the Association of Surgeons of India from 2013 – 2015 and served as its overseas coordinator between 2009 and 2012.

He served as the founder Honorary Secretary (2011–13), Vice President (2013–14) and as President (2015 – 2017) of the Association of Breast Surgeons of India (ABSI), the youngest in the organization's history. He also started the 'ABSI-UK Fellowship Programme', which allows surgical trainees from India selected on merit to obtain 'hands on' one year subspecialty training in breast centres of excellence in the UK

He served as a member of the board of advocates of the American Society of Breast Surgeons in 2009, the first surgeon from outside USA to sit in the board.

He has been associated with the Indian Association of Surgical Oncology as a member, as its overseas coordinator (2005–08), as the editorial secretary (2009–10), as a member of the executive committee (2011–12) and as the joint editor of its official journal, Indian Journal of Surgical Oncology (IJSO) (2010–14).

He is the author of many articles on breast healthcare and has contributed nine chapters in three text books including the text book series, Recent Advances in Surgery and Bailey & Love Revision Guide.

Awards and recognition

Ram features in the 2021 Queen Elizabeth II New Year's honours list and is one of the youngest Surgeons of Indian origin in over 100 years to be honoured with an OBE – Officer of the Most Excellent Order of the British Empire, conferred in recognition of his services to breast cancer care and surgical education in India and to UK-India relations. He was formally conferred the OBE on 30 March 2022 at Windsor Castle by His Royal Highness Prince Charles, Prince of Wales.

The Government of India included Ram in the 2015 Republic day honours list for the fourth highest Indian civilian award of Padma Shri, making him the youngest surgeon from the southern Indian states of Telangana & Andhra Pradesh to have been conferred the award by the President of India.

In 2017, the Medical council of India selected him for the Dr B C Roy National award for 'Outstanding service in the field of Socio Medical Relief' for 2016.

In 2021, he became the first surgeon of Indian origin to be conferred the Honorary Fellowship of The Association of Surgeons of Great Britain & Ireland.

In October 2021, he delivered the "Distinguished Lecture" of the United States Chapter of International Society of Surgery on "Disrupting Breast Healthcare in India" at the 107th annual Congress of the American College of Surgeons (ACS). He was amongst the eleven doctors alongside Anthony Fauci and was the only surgeon from outside the US to have delivered the 'Named Lecture" at the world's largest Surgical Congress.

In 2019, he was conferred Honorary Fellowship (Hon.FRCS) by the Royal College of Surgeons of Thailand and Honorary Fellowship (Hon.FCCS) from the Chinese College of Surgeons and Honorary Fellowship (Hon.FCSSL) from the College of Surgeons of Sri Lanka in 2020 

He received the Overseas Gold Medal from the Royal College of Surgeons of Edinburgh in 2013, the youngest ever recipient of the award in the 515 years history of the college.

He is a recipient of Visishta Ugadi Puraskar,  which is a State award conferred by the Government of undivided Andhra Pradesh and Vishal Bharat Ugadi Puraskar by the Delhi Telugu Academy.

He was made a Paul Harris Fellow by the Rotary International to recognise his contribution to the Rotary Foundation and conferred the Vocational Excellence award by the Rotary Club of Jubilee Hills for his  service in Breast Oncology.

He is a recipient of the Edward Kennedy Memorial Award for 'improving the art and science of Breast Oncology in South Asia'.

He is one of the youngest surgeons and the only one from the southern Indian States of Telangana and Andhra Pradesh to have delivered Col. Pandalai Oration (2018), which is the highest academic honour that can be achieved by a surgeon practicing in India.

COVID 19 response 

Pillarisetti was invited to be part of a UNICEF campaign in partnership with the Government of India to create awareness about COVID-19.

In May 2021, to address the rapidly rising infections and deaths associated with COVID-19 in Rural India, under the auspices of Ushalakshmi Breast Cancer Foundation & KIMS-USHALAKSHMI Centre for Breast Diseases in Hyderabad, Pillarisetti went on the "COVID-19 Pink Ribbon Mask Campaign" in the southern Indian State of Telangana.  20,000 masks have been distributed to residents in all the ten villages in Narayanraopet Mandal, Siddipet in the State of Telangana (Narayanaraopet, Ibrahimpur, Banjerpalli, Kodhandaraopalli, Laxmidevipalli, Malyala, Gurralagondhi, Jakkapur, Gopulapur, Matindla).

In his capacity as President, The Association of Surgeons of India, he championed a major fund-raising movement from the surgical fraternity and organised the procurement/delivery of the Personal Protection Equipment  for healthcare professionals across India, which was in acute shortage at that time.

Philanthropy
In 2015, he adopted Ibrahimpur, the remotest village in Medak District in the State of Telangana, which has a population of 1500.

References

Further reading

External links

Recipients of the Padma Shri in medicine
1966 births
People from Guntur
Indian medical academics
Indian medical writers
Indian oncologists
Living people
Indian surgeons
Medical doctors from Andhra Pradesh
20th-century Indian medical doctors
20th-century surgeons